Moaning Lisa may refer to:

 Moaning Lisa (band), an Australian alternative rock band
 "Moaning Lisa" (The Simpsons), the 6th episode of the first season

See also
 "Moaning Lisa Smile", a 2014 song by Wolf Alice
 Mona Lisa (disambiguation)